Elizabeth Hamilton (1756 or 1758 – 23 July 1816) was a Scottish essayist, poet, satirist and novelist, who in both her prose and fiction entered into the French-revolutionary era controversy in Britain over the education and rights of women.

Early life
She was most probably born on 25 July 1756, though the date is often given as 1758. She was born in Belfast, the third and youngest child of Charles Hamilton (d.1759), a Scottish merchant, and his wife Katherine Mackay (d.1767).

In Belfast Hamilton's parents were on familiar terms with the town's prominent "New Light" Presbyterian families and with their Scottish Enlightenment social and political ideas. Her later thoughts on child education were greatly influenced by David Manson's co-educational English Grammar School, which her older sister Katherine attended with other children from this progressive milieu. Manson advertised the school's capacity to teach children to read and understand the English tongue "without the discipline of the rod by intermingling pleasurable and healthful exercise with their instruction".

In 1762, after the death of her father, her mother sent Hamilton to live with her paternal aunt, Mrs Marshall who lived near Stirling. In 1772, she lived at Ingram's Crook near Bannockburn.

Career
Her first literary efforts were directed in supporting her brother Charles in his orientalist and linguistic studies. After his death in 1792 she continued to publish orientalist scholarship, as well as historical, educationalist and theoretical works.

Hamilton maintained Belfast connections. She established a particularly close friendship with Martha McTier (sister of William Drennan, the founder of the United Irishmen), who pioneered schooling for poor girls. In 1793 she visited McTier in Belfast approving of her pedagogic efforts. "My little girls", boasted McTier, "do not gabble over the testament only, nor read with that difficulty which prevents pleasure in it... I keep up my number and four of them can read Fox and Pitt".

In 1796 she published Translation of the Letters of the Hindoo Rajah. The two volume work in the tradition of Montesquieu and Goldsmith, follows the adventures in England of an Indian prince. His encounters with slave owners, capricious aristocrats, sceptical philosophers and belligerent women leads to his progressive disillusionment with the host culture.

In 1800 Hamilton produced Memoirs of Modern Philosophers.  The novel was a response to the Revolution Controversy of the 1790s, a discussion of “revolutionary ideas about a broader franchise, primogeniture, meritocracy, marriage and divorce”. Conservative loyalists such as Hannah More argued that “there is a different bent of understanding in the sexes” while those their detractors denounced as "Jacobins",  such as Wollstonecraft insisted that “there is no sex in the soul or mind” and that women were limited only by their inadequate education. In Memoirs, Hamilton seems to occupy a middle ground, urging greater educational opportunity for women but within the bounds of a consciously Christian, middle-class morality that emphasises women's responsibility for the domestic sphere.

Hamilton's most important pedagogical works followed: Letters on Education (1801), Letters on the Elementary Principles of Education (1801), Letters addressed to the Daughter of a Nobleman, on the Formation of Religious and Moral Principle (1806), and Hints addressed to the Patrons and Directors of Schools (1815).

In 1808, Hamilton wrote The Cottagers of Glenburnie (1808), a celebrated tale of Scottish manners and mores which cast a critical eye on hardships and inequities endured by women in domestic life. It also occasioned a lengthy discourse on child education. The fictional Mr Gourley and Mrs Mason direct the teacher William Morrison's efforts to reorganise his school on a spare-the-rod monitorial system emphasising accountability and self-government. Mrs Gourley cites David Manson's account of "what he calls his play school", and in a footnote Hamilton further acknowledges Manson. His "extraordinary talents", she suggests, were exercised in Belfast "in too limited a sphere" to attract the attention they deserved.

Hamilton spent much of her later life in Edinburgh. She died in Harrogate, England after a short illness.

Bibliography

References

Further reading

 Benger, Elizabeth (1818). Memoirs of the Late Mrs. Elizabeth Hamilton, 2 Vols. London: Longman, Hurst, Rees, Orme, and Brown.
 Boyle, Deborah (2021). "Elizabeth Hamilton's Memoirs of Modern Philosophers as a Philosophical Text." British Journal for the History of Philosophy
Boyle, Deborah (2021). "Elizabeth Hamilton on Sympathy and the Selfish Principle." Journal of Scottish Philosophy 19, no. 3, pp. 219–41.
 Egenolf, Susan B. (2009). The Art of Political Fiction in Hamilton, Edgeworth, and Owenson. Farnham, England; Burlington, VT: Ashgate.
 Edgeworth, Maria (1816). "Character and Writings of Mrs Elizabeth Hamilton," The Gentleman's Magazine, Vol. 86, pp. 623–24.
Gokcekus, Samin. (2019). "Elizabeth Hamilton's Scottish Associationism: Early Nineteenth-Century Philosophy of Mind." Journal of the American Philosophical Association 5, no. 3, pp. 267–85.
 Gordon, Alexander (1894). "Elizabeth Hamilton 1756–1816," Ulster Journal of Archaeology, Vol. 1, No. 1, pp. 23–28.
 Grogan, Claire (2002). "Crossing Genre, Gender and Race in Elizabeth Hamilton's 'Translation of the Letters of a Hindoo Rajah'," Studies in the Novel, Vol. 34, No. 1, pp. 21–42.
 Grogan, Claire (2006). "Identifying Foreign Bodies: New Philosophers and Hottentots in Elizabeth Hamilton's Memoirs of Modern Philosophers," Eighteen-century Fiction, Vol. 18, No. 3, pp. 305–27.
 Kelly, Gary (1993). Women, Writing, and Revolution, 1790-1827. Oxford: Clarendon Press.
 Lawrenson, Sonja (2012). "Revolution, Rebellion and a Rajah from Rohilkhand: Recontextualizing Elizabeth Hamilton's 'Translation of the Letters of a Hindoo Rajah'," Studies in Romanticism, Vol. 51, No. 2, pp. 125–47.
 Mellor, Anne K. (2005). "Romantic Orientalism Begins at Home: Elizabeth Hamilton's 'Translations of the Letters of a Hindoo Rajah'," Studies in Romanticism, Vol. 44, No. 2, pp. 151–64.
 Narain, Mona (2006). "Colonial Desires: The Fantasy of Empire and Elizabeth Hamilton's "Translations of the Letters of a Hindoo Rajah", Studies in Romanticism, Vol. 45, No. 4, pp. 585–98.
 Taylor, Susan B. (2000). "Feminism and Orient in Elizabeth Hamilton's Translation of the Letters of a Hindoo Rajah," Women's Studies, Vol. 29, pp. 555–81.
 Ty, Eleanor (2000). "Novel and History in Anti-Jacobin Satire," English Studies, Vol. 30, pp. 71–81.
 Tytler, Sarah & Watson, Jean L. (1871). "Mrs. Elizabeth Hamilton (1758–1816)." In: The Songstresses of Scotland. Edinburgh: H.B. Higgins, pp. 290–328.

External links

 
 Works by Elizabeth Hamilton at Hathi Trust
 Elizabeth Hamilton entry in the Literary Encyclopedia

1756 births
1816 deaths
18th-century Scottish writers
18th-century British women writers
18th-century Scottish novelists
19th-century British women writers
19th-century Scottish writers
Writers from Belfast
Scottish women novelists
Scottish essayists
Scottish women essayists
Scottish satirists
Women of the Regency era
British women essayists
Women satirists
Scottish women poets